The words "Neither snow nor rain nor heat nor gloom of night stays these couriers from the swift completion of their appointed rounds" have long been associated with the American postal worker. Though not an official creed or motto of the United States Postal Service, the Postal Service acknowledges it as an informal motto along with Charles W. Eliot's poem "The Letter".

The phrase's association with the U.S. Mail originated with its inscription on New York City's General Post Office Building, which opened in 1914. The inscription was added to the building by William M. Kendall of the architectural firm of McKim, Mead & White, the building's architects. The phrase derives from a passage in George Herbert Palmer's translation of Herodotus' Histories, referring to the courier service of the ancient Persian Empire:

This slogan is not a formal commitment, and in fact the USPS routinely delays mail during bad weather.



References

External links
Postal History

Creed
Mottos
Herodotus